Sant Bux Singh is an Indian politician. He was a Member of Parliament, representing Fatehpur, Uttar Pradesh in the Lok Sabha, the lower house of India's Parliament as a member of the Indian National Congress.

References

External links
Official biographical sketch in Parliament of India website

Lok Sabha members from Uttar Pradesh
Indian National Congress politicians
1931 births
Possibly living people